Ruth Anderson  may refer to:

 Ruth Anderson (composer) (Evelyn Ruth Anderson; 1928–2019), composer (electronic music pioneer), orchestrator, and flutist
 Ruth Anderson (lawyer), Scottish lawyer
 Ruth Anderson (accountant) (born 1954), Enniskillen Northern Ireland accountant
 E. Ruth Anderson (Elsie Ruth Anderson; 1907–1989), book editor (musicology) and notable meteorologist
 Ruth Anderson-Horrell (born 1984), New Zealand weightlifter
 Sherry Ruth Anderson (born 1942), psychologist and co-author of The Cultural Creatives